Berenzaki (also Romanized as Berenzakī or Berenzáki) is a village in Karian Rural District, in the Central District of Minab County, Hormozgan Province, Iran. At the 2006 census, its population was 65 in 13 families.

References 

Populated places in Minab County